The 1958 California lieutenant gubernatorial election was held on November 4, 1958. Democratic nominee Glenn M. Anderson narrowly defeated incumbent Republican Harold J. Powers with 50.87% of the vote.

General election

Candidates
Glenn M. Anderson, Democratic 
Harold J. Powers, Republican

Results

References

California
1958
Lieutenant